Constituency WR-20 is a reserved seat for women in the Khyber Pakhtunkhwa Assembly.

See also
 Constituency PK-80 (Swat-I)
 Constituency PK-81 (Swat-II)
 Constituency PK-82 (Swat-III)
 Constituency PK-83 (Swat-IV)
 Constituency PK-84 (Swat-V)
 Constituency PK-85 (Swat-VI)
 Constituency PK-86 (Swat-VII)
 Constituency WR-08

References

Khyber Pakhtunkhwa Assembly constituencies